The Evansville Museum of Arts, History & Science is a general-interest museum located on the Ohio riverfront in downtown Evansville, Indiana, United States. Founded in 1904, it is one of Southern Indiana's most established and significant cultural institutions, with comprehensive collections in art, history, anthropology and science. It has a permanent collection of over 30,000 objects including fine arts, decorative arts, historic documents and photographs, and anthropologic and natural history artifacts.  Also on the museum's campus is the Evansville Museum Transportation Center, featuring Southern Indiana transportation artifacts from the late 19th through the mid-20th centuries.  The museum is accredited by the American Alliance of Museums.

History of the Museum

The story of the Evansville Museum began in 1874 when the Ladies’ Literary Club was founded.  The members of the club were invested in studying art, history, and literature, and they were passionate about encouraging the study of art in Evansville.  Initially, they obtained one exhibition that was housed in the Willard Library.  After the success of the exhibition, they obtained more exhibitions and artifacts and were then in need of a museum building.

The first building selected for the museum was the historic Barnes-Armstrong Mansion at the foot of Cherry Street in Sunset Park.  However, in 1910 a controversial decision was made to demolish the Mansion for safety reasons, and the museum's artifacts were temporarily placed in the Old Court House.  Although many artifacts were lost or destroyed in the move, the museum was reopened in 1928 in the old YWCA building under the name Temple of Fine Arts and History.  It was meant to be a sanctuary of art for the Evansville community.

In 1938 there were efforts to move the museum to a new building.  However, it was not until the 1950s when Siegfried R. Weng became the director of the museum that the dream of a new structure was finally fulfilled. The museum resides in that building today, although it underwent an extensive expansion and renovation and reopened in 2014.

Expansion
In 2008 the museum announced a three-year expansion and renovation plan.  In October 2012 the plan was modified to include a glass walled, rectangular addition with a domed immersive planetarium and theater. The domed theater is entirely inside the building box, visible from the exterior. A pedestrian-friendly plaza and new museum entrance connects the addition to parking and the Evansville Museum Transportation Center. The expansion, which began with repairs, renovations and additions to its existing building was completed at a cost of $14.1 million. The museum re-opened its doors to the public on February 7, 2014. A key piece of the project, the new Koch Immersive Theater features a 40-foot diameter domed screen with a 360 degree digital projection.

Overview of the Museum Today
Permanent exhibit galleries include learning spaces devoted to art, history, anthropology and participatory science. Artworks from the 16th century to the present are in the museum's permanent galleries. Visitors can also stroll down the street of a 19th-century American rivertown to see ornately decorated homes and shops.

The museum offers changing  history and science exhibitions in its Center for History and Science  and changing art exhibitions throughout the year.
An area for families offers participatory exhibits and programs to inspire and instruct students of all ages. Interesting and informative science demonstrations are performed by student volunteers most weekend afternoons. The Koch Immersive Theater & Planetarium houses a 40-foot diameter domed screen with 360-degree digital projection. Programming for the theater includes traditional astronomy programs and giant screen, immersive films that span a range of topics heavily weighted toward space and astronomy.  Tickets to the Immersive Theater are included with a $12 Adult and $7 Youth (3-18) admission to the museum. Theater tickets are available a la carte for $7 for Adults and $5 for Youth (3-18).  More information and show times can be found at http://emuseum.org.

The Evansville Museum Transportation Center traces the history of transportation and features the Milwaukee Road 1416 steam locomotive. The transportation center also includes a L&N Tennessee Club Car and a caboose. The locomotive is a 1908 Milwaukee Road 0-6-0 I-5 switcher steam engine, believed to be the last of its kind. More information can be found at http://www.emuseum.org/transportation-center.

The museum has produced notable solo exhibitions of artists such as John Stuart Ingle, Don Gummer, and Theodore Clement Steele, sometimes in collaboration with other institutions, including the Wadsworth Atheneum, the Butler Institute of American Art, and the Indiana State Museum.

Arts
The Evansville Museum's permanent art collection of American and European works dating from the 16th through the 20th centuries is exhibited in the Crescent Galleries which highlight the themes of landscape, still life, genre works, and portraiture.

The Old Gallery, the John Streetman Alcove, and the Main Gallery feature temporary exhibitions of touring collections, exhibitions from the museum's own collections, and the work of regional artists.

History

Visitors can stroll down the brick-paved street of a 19th-century American rivertown to see period homes and shops stocked with notions and sundries.  There are also galleries dedicated to early Evansville history, Abraham Lincoln, and the home front effort during WWII.

The Humankind Gallery offers a fascinating look at world cultures with an emphasis on North and South America, Africa, and Asia.

Science

The Welborn Baptist Foundation Family Place is a hands-on science gallery created especially for families.  Family Place is also the new home for the museum's iconic Alaskan Kodiak Brown Bear, named Kodi, and an interactive science demonstration area.

The Evansville Convention and Visitors Bureau Center for History and Science gallery offers changing science and history exhibitions.

Koch Immersive Theater

Explore space and rediscover our amazing planet in the stunning Koch Immersive Theater where you will be able to see traditional planetarium shows as well as full-dome digital films.  Our new 40-foot dome features style seating, a 10,000-watt digital surround sound system and imagery resulting in an immersive experience more like flying than watching a movie.

EMTRAC

The exhibitions of the Evansville Museum Transportation Center, EMTRAC, interpret transportation in Southern Indiana from the latter part of the 19th century through the mid 20th century.  Included in the exhibitions are a historic three-car train; a 1910 Sears Motor Car; and the intricate model railroad Charlotte's Evansville.

See also
Frederick Carder
Jane Frank
William Gropper
Jerry Wilkerson

References

Bibliography

John Camp;  John Stuart Ingle;  Evansville Museum of Arts and Science;  Wadsworth Atheneum. The eye and the heart : watercolors of John Stuart Ingle (New York : Rizzoli ; Evansville, Ind. : Evansville Museum of Arts & Science, 1988) ; 
Don Gummer;  Peter Plagens;  Evansville Museum of Arts, History and Science.;  Butler Institute of American Art.;  Indiana State Museum. The lyrical constructivist : Don Gummer sculpture (Chesterfield, Mass. : Chameleon Books ; Evansville, Ind. : Evansville Museum of Arts, History & Science, 2001) ; ; 
William H Gerdts;  T. C. Steele;  Evansville Museum of Arts and Science;  Valparaiso University Museum of Art. Theodore Clement Steele, an American master of light (New York, N.Y. : Chameleon Books, 1995) (Worldcat link:) OCLC 33132008

NB: Some WorldCat listings and other sources refer to this museum as the "Evansville Museum of Arts and Science". It is also commonly called the "Evansville Museum".

External links

Museums in Evansville, Indiana
Art museums and galleries in Indiana
History museums in Indiana
Science museums in Indiana
Institutions accredited by the American Alliance of Museums
Museums established in 1904
1904 establishments in Indiana